
Gmina Będzino is a rural gmina (administrative district) in Koszalin County, West Pomeranian Voivodeship, in north-western Poland.

Villages
Gmina Będzino contains the villages and settlements of Barnin, Barninek, Będzinko, Będzino, Borkowice, Dobiesławiec, Dobre, Dobre Małe, Dobrzyca, Dworek, Kazimierz Pomorski, Kiszkowo, Kładno, Komory, Łasin Koszaliński, Łękno, Łopienica, Łubniki, Malinowo, Mączno, Miłogoszcz, Mścice, Pakosław, Pleśna, Podamirowo, Podbórz, Popowo, Przybyradz, Radomno (Dobiesławiec) Skrzeszewo, Słowienkowo, Śmiechów, Smolne, Stoisław, Strachomino, Strzepowo, Strzeżenice, Strzeżnice, Świercz, Tymień, Uliszki, Wiciąże Pierwsze, Wierzchominko, Wierzchomino, Zagaj and Ziębrze.

Neighbouring gminas
Gmina Będzino is bordered by the city of Koszalin and by the gminas of Biesiekierz, Dygowo, Karlino, Mielno, Sianów and Ustronie Morskie.

References
 Polish official population figures 2006

Bedzino
Koszalin County